Juan Fernando Cobo Agudelo (born August 27, 1959, in Cali, Colombia) is a Colombian painter, illustrator, sculptor and cultural promoter, one of the most notable artists of his native region, Valle del Cauca.

Artistic career
Cobo has lived and worked in places ranging from his native Cali and nearby Bogotá to Quito, Chicago, New York, Tucson and Madrid, something which has given him a broad vision of art. His work has been featured in both group and individual exhibitions since 1977, in Colombia and around the world.

In recent years, he has also edited and directed the online Latin American cultural magazine, Primera Plana - www.primeraplana.co.
In 2005, he called upon a number of writers and poets from Latin America and Spain to produce a literary anthology about the topic of violence and how it affects women, a particularly significant issue in recent Latin American history. The result was a book titled MUJER, Soledad y Violencia (Literally "Woman, Solitude and Violence"), which he subsequently illustrated.

Current activities
The artist currently lives and works in the outskirts of Cali, where he devotes his time both to the exploration of painting and artistic materials and techniques. The artist's online magazine has been discontinued as of 2007.

External links
 https://web.archive.org/web/20071008112216/http://juanfernandocobo.com/ - The artist's personal website (in Spanish).
 https://web.archive.org/web/20060810170449/http://www.gentecontalento.net/ - The artist's former cultural magazine (in Spanish), now unavailable.
 http://www.primeraplana.co - The artist's actual cultural magazine (in Spanish).

Sources
 Cobo A., Juan Fernando, (Ed.). MUJER, Soledad y Violencia. 1st ed. Santiago de Cali: Gente con Talento Ltda., 2005.  .
 ArteLista.com, Online Gallery. Entry at http://cobo.artelista.com/ (In Spanish)
 World Artist Directory https://web.archive.org/web/20071008114508/http://accessarts.net/cgi-bin/webdata/webdata_artz.pl?pagenum=81&cgifunction=Search&all_search=painting+watercolor+oil+acrylic&allany=+or+
 Art History Archive http://www.arthistoryarchive.com/arthistory/glossary/Painters-by-Nationality.html

1959 births
Living people
Colombian painters
Colombian male painters
Modern sculptors
Modern painters
20th-century Colombian sculptors